Pardi is a town and a municipality in Valsad district in the Indian state of Gujarat. Historically, there is a Hill in the middle of the town facing the lake where it is said Shivaji built the Killa (Fort). It's from this Killa (Fort) that the town is also called Killa-Pardi. Roughly 14 km south of the district headquarters city of Valsad,  has a rail station on the Mumbai-Vadodara line of Western Railway (India). National Highway 8 bisects the town in east and west regions. The town has a municipality office and a court. The town centre also known for the Bus Stop at the intersection of Roads from Chival (East), Umarsadi (West), Damni Zampa (South) and Valsadi Zampa (North). Pardi has a wonderful lake called Talav spread over 99 acres which is proposed to be made tourist place in the near future.

The city of Vapi, a large industrial township for small-scale industries, Roughly 14 km south of Pardi town. Pardi has its own industrial zone which is governed by GIDC and caters mainly to the Textile industry.

Udvada, the holy town for Parsis, is about 7 km south of Pardi town.

Daman & Dadra Nagar Haveli, a famous tourist destination, is about 16 km south of Pardi town.

Geography
It has an average elevation of 18 metres (59 feet).

Demographics
The Pardi Municipality has population of 28,495 of which 14,648 are males while 13,847 are females as per report released by Census India 2011.

Population of Children with age of 0-6 is 2704 which is 9.49% of total population of Pardi (M). In Pardi Municipality, Female Sex Ratio is of 945 against state average of 919. Moreover Child Sex Ratio in Pardi is around 891 compared to Gujarat state average of 890. Literacy rate of Pardi city is 87.10% higher than state average of 78.03%. In Pardi, Male literacy is around 90.91% while female literacy rate is 83.09%.

References

External links
 The Pardi Education Society

Cities and towns in Valsad district